Batman Apollo  is a novel by Victor Pelevin first published in 2013.

The novel is a sequel to Pelevin's seven-year-old vampire novel Empire V. The main character is the same – the young vampire Rama. The vampires in the novel feed on "bablos," which is a kind of metaphysical concentrate of money, and they fool people with the help of glamour and discourse. As the author writes: Glamour is sex expressed through money, discourse is sex that is lacking, expressed through money that is not.

Plot
Rama is a young vampire who has already mastered the vampire craft. He already knows the basics: he can stealthily bite a person's neck, so that from the little red liquid all the secrets of that person's soul are revealed to him. As we already know from the first part of the novel – vampires rule the world.

Now Rama faces another great challenge: trained as a diver, he plunges again and again into uncertainty, into the realm between life and death, and also meets the supreme vampire, the eternal Dracula, who shares with him the secrets of this world. 

Modern culture in general, the actual world order as a whole (both in Russian and Western variants) in Pelevin evoke a passionate aversion. In generalized form, the essence can be conveyed as follows. There is an elite in the world, more or less understanding the essence of the processes taking place (the vampires and the Chaldeans chosen from among the people serving them), and the rest of humanity. The elite control people with discourse (ideological twaddle) and glamour (the cultural contentlessness of consumer society). Simply put, by messing with the minds of the average person. The media, the Internet, computer games, and so on serve the same purpose.

The main intrigue of the novel is that in the Russian situation of social and legal disadvantage, these tools no longer work.

Analysis 

Some literary critics have marked this novel as Pelevin's most static novel; its characters-as always, rather symbols, functions, mediums for the transmission of ideas-do not experience any special adventures here, flying on webbed wings from dream to the postmortem "limbo" zone and from there to reality, which can also turn out to be dream or postmortem. 

Along the way, various aspects of the illusory self and the endless cycle of desire as a cause of suffering are revealed to them - revealed, as usual, with lucid, sarcastic examples from today, up to the hashtags and the game "Call of Duty".

The protagonist of the novel chews up the typical route of the soul of the Pelevin hero - from fond memories of the blissful edges of childhood through the absurdity and curvature of the "desert of reality" to the exit from this world, dissolution in the "universal river of absolute love" - is broken here: souls have nothing to remember and nothing to hope for, they are doomed to wander in the maze of their own suffering, and this torture chamber has a name for the first time.

The liberal political correctness inherent in the Western world is, for Pelevin, another invented way of deception, but the ultimate concentration of bitterness and despair is achieved here, in the territory of the "temporary administration of the northern pipe. 

Russia is a place where the most brilliant minds are subjected to the most unbearable conditions of existence, and neither "improvements in welfare" nor "fair elections" are the way out of this endless dead end - any ennobling and streamlining of Russian life will inevitably be surrounded by so much stupidity and humiliation, that the total proportion of suffering will remain unchanged. 

Nothing will be fixed here, and even the people on the Forbes list who buy a "golden parachute" - in Pelevin's terminology, a favorable posthumous rebirth - are bound to be ditched, cheated, and given to the devils. 

The best one can hope for is to reach the state of a peasant with a beard, smiling blissfully on the backstreet: but it seems that even the author himself sees how ridiculous this collective farm nirvana looks. 

The individual evolution of the protagonist in this novel interests Pelevin - as always - far more than the movements of the masses. As the story progresses, Rama gradually, without noticing it, begins to transform himself into a spontaneous revolutionary. He becomes nauseated by the blatant exploitative politics of the blood-sucking brothers, but the way back to the people who can still harbor illusions about their own ability to change things is closed to him.

In his scholastic dialogues with Dracula, Sophie, the Emperor and his mentor, the dying vampire Osiris, he follows the path that ordinary people sometimes experience when they begin to realize that they too are being used, that they too are being bled and that this will go on forever-until they themselves, having overcome laziness and inertia, say "enough. 

In the finale, the novel's protagonist, a loner, a major, a narcissistic slacker, tormented by speculative questions, goes out on the square with a solitary picket, having previously put a balaclava on his head. He was a superman, and now he is a man.

References

Novels by Victor Pelevin
2013 novels
Novels set in Russia
21st-century Russian novels
Vampire novels
Sequel novels